Jacques Reich (10 August 1852 – 8 July 1923) was a Hungarian portrait etcher, active mainly in the United States.

Biography
He first studied art in Budapest. In 1873 he came to the U.S. and continued his studies at the National Academy of Design in New York and the Pennsylvania Academy of Fine Arts in Philadelphia. In 1879 he went to Paris to study for a year under the noted painters William-Adolphe Bouguereau and Joseph Nicolas Robert-Fleury.

In 1880 Reich returned to Philadelphia, and in 1885 moved to New York and established a studio there. For some years he devoted himself to portraits for Appletons' Cyclopædia of American Biography, numbering over 2,000, and most of the portraits for Scribner’s Cyclopedia of Painters and Paintings. In addition he made many pen and ink illustrations for magazines and text books.

In the early nineties he turned to etchings on copper and specialized in this field for over 25 years. He etched and published some 14 portraits of American and English authors, poets and artists, and a series of portraits of Famous Americans number some 25 subjects. In addition he executed many private commissions for etched portraits, among them Whitelaw Reid, E. H. Harriman, H. H. Rogers, Nelson W. Aldrich, Charles B. Alexander and John W. Mackay.

In 1892 he married Caroline Bellinger, daughter of Emil Bellinger of Frankfurt, Germany. He then became a resident of New Dorp, Staten Island, and lived there until his death on July 8, 1923.

Gallery

References
Notes

External links

Jacques Reich - Gallery
Jacques Reich Portrait Prints, 1890–1923, undated, PR 102, at the New-York Historical Society.

American portrait painters
1852 births
1923 deaths
American etchers
Hungarian emigrants to the United States
National Academy of Design alumni
19th-century American painters
19th-century American male artists
American male painters
20th-century American painters
20th-century American printmakers
People from New Dorp, Staten Island
20th-century American male artists